The Cornell box is a test aimed at determining the accuracy of rendering software by comparing the rendered scene with an actual photograph of the same scene, and has become a commonly used 3D test model. It was created by Cindy M. Goral, Kenneth E. Torrance, Donald P. Greenberg, and Bennett Battaile at the Cornell University Program of Computer Graphics for their paper Modeling the Interaction of Light Between Diffuse Surfaces published and presented at SIGGRAPH'84.

A physical model of the box is created and photographed with a CCD camera. The exact settings are then measured from the scene: emission spectrum of the light source, reflectance spectra of all the surfaces, exact position and size of all objects, walls, light source and camera.

The same scene is then reproduced in the renderer, and the output file is compared with the photograph.

The basic environment consists of:
One light source in the center of a white ceiling
A green right wall
A red left wall
A white back wall
A white floor

Objects are often placed inside the box. The first objects placed inside the environment were two white boxes. Another common version first used to test photon mapping includes two spheres: one with a perfect mirror surface and one made of glass.

The physical properties of the box are designed to show diffuse interreflection. For example, some light should reflect off the red and green walls and bounce onto the white walls, so parts of the white walls should appear slightly red or green.

Today, the Cornell box is often used to demonstrate renderers in a similar way as the Stanford bunny and the Utah teapot are; computer scientists often use the scene just for its visual properties without comparing it to test data from a physical model.

See also 
3D modeling
Utah teapot
Stanford bunny
Stanford dragon
List of common 3D test models

References

External links

The Cornell Box website

3D graphics models
Test items